Haxtun is a statutory town in Phillips County, Colorado, United States The town population was 981 at the 2020 United States Census.

Geography

Demographics

As of the census of 2010, there were 946 people, 405 households, and 257 families residing in the town. The racial makeup of the town was 96.4% White, 0.10% African American, 0.7% Native American, 0.2% Asian, 0.10% Pacific Islander, 1.0% from other races, and 1.50% from two or more races. Hispanic or Latino of any race were 3.8% of the population.

There were 405 households, out of which 26.7% had children under the age of 18 living with them, 52.8% were married couples living together, 7.9% had a female householder with no husband present, and 36.5% were non-families. 34.1% of all households were made up of individuals, and 34.1% had someone living alone who was 65 years of age or older.  The average household size was 2.26 and the average family size was 2.93.

In the town, the population was spread out, with 26.6% under the age of 18, and 73.4% were 18 years of age or older.  The median age was 39.9 years. For every 100 females, there were 112.3 males.  For every 100 females age 18 and over, there were 111.4 males.

See also

 List of municipalities in Colorado

References

External links

 CDOT map of the Town of X

Towns in Phillips County, Colorado
Towns in Colorado